Bardakçı is a Turkish surname. Notable people with the surname include:

 Murat Bardakçı (born 1955), Turkish journalist
 Ulaş Bardakçı (1947–1972), Turkish communist
  (born 1956), Turkish author

See also
 Bardakçı, Çat

Turkish-language surnames